India competed at the 2014 Summer Youth Olympics, in Nanjing, China from 16 August to 28 August 2014. India, which had won 8 medals in 2010 games, managed just 2 medals this time.

Medalists

Archery

Two archers from India qualified due to their performance at the 2013 World Archery Youth Championships.

Athletics

Five athletes from India qualified.

Qualification Legend: Q=Final A (medal); qB=Final B (non-medal)

Boys
Track & road events

Field Events

Girls
Track & road events

Field events

Badminton

Two shuttlers from India qualified based on the BWF World Junior Rankings.

Boxing

Two boxers from India qualified based on their performance in the 2014 Youth World Championships.

Boys

Canoeing

One boat from India qualified based on its performance at the 2013 World Junior Canoe Sprint and Slalom Championships.

Girls

Qualification Legend: Q=Next Round; qR=Repechage

Golf

One team of two athletes from India qualified based on the 8 June 2014 IGF Combined World Amateur Golf Rankings.

Gymnastics

Artistic Gymnastics

One gymnast from India qualified based on the performance at the 2014 Asian Artistic Gymnastics Championships.

Boys

Rowing

One boat from India qualified based on its performance at the Asian Qualification Regatta.

Qualification Legend: FA=Final A (medal); FB=Final B (non-medal); R=Repechage

Sailing

India was given a reallocation boat based on being a top ranked nation not yet qualified.

Shooting

2 shooters from India qualified based on their performance in the 2014 Asian Shooting Championships.

Individual

Team

Swimming

India qualified two swimmers.

Table Tennis

2 athletes from India qualified based on their performance in the 2014 Asian Qualifying Event.

Singles

Qualification Legend: Q=Main Bracket (medal); qB=Consolation Bracket (non-medal)

Tennis

One athlete from India qualified based on the 9 June 2014 ITF World Junior Rankings.

Weightlifting

Two lifters in the boys' events and one lifter in the girls' event qualified from India based on the team ranking after the 2013 Weightlifting Youth World Championships.

Wrestling

Four wrestlers from India qualified based on their performance at the 2014 Asian Cadet Championships.

References

2014 in Indian sport
Nations at the 2014 Summer Youth Olympics
India at the Youth Olympics